Border Bandits is a 1946 American Western film directed by Lambert Hillyer. It is the nineteenth film in the "Marshal Nevada Jack McKenzie" series, and stars Johnny Mack Brown as Jack McKenzie and Raymond Hatton as his sidekick Sandy Hopkins, with Riley Hill, Rosa del Rosario and John Merton.

Cast
Johnny Mack Brown as Nevada McKenzie  	 
Raymond Hatton as Sandy Hopkins 
Riley Hill as Steve Halliday	 
Rosa del Rosario as Celia  	 
John Merton as Spike	 
Tom Quinn as Pepper	 
Frank La Rue as John Halliday	 
Steve Clark as Doc Bowles	 
Charles Stevens as José	 
Lucio Villegas as Gonzales  	 
Bud Osborne as Dutch 	 
Pat R. McGee as Cupid

References

External links

Films directed by Lambert Hillyer
1946 Western (genre) films
American Western (genre) films
American black-and-white films
1940s English-language films
1940s American films